Mian Farirud (also Romanized as Mīān Farīrūd; also known as Mīān Farārūd) is a village in Blukat Rural District, Rahmatabad and Blukat District, Rudbar County, Gilan Province, Iran. At the 2006 census, its population was 139, in 37 families.

References 

Populated places in Rudbar County